Kristof Vizvary (born 21 August 1983 in Lower Austria) is a professional handball player. Kristof first played in UHC Tulln, now he plays in UHK Krems. He is 198 cm (6'6") tall and weighs 105 kg (231 lb.).

External links
Kristof Vizvary's profile

1983 births
Living people
Austrian male handball players
Sportspeople from Lower Austria
21st-century Austrian people